Aggro is a slang term meaning aggravation or aggression. "Aggro" may also refer to:

In music
 The Aggrolites, a "dirty" reggae band from Los Angeles, California
 "A.G.G.R.O", a song by The Aggrolites
 "Aggro", a 2007 song by Paul Hartnoll from his album, The Ideal Condition
 Aggro Santos, a Brazilian-English rapper
 "Aggro", a 2007 song by The Enemy from their album, We'll Live and Die in These Towns
 Aggro Berlin, a German hip hop label
 Aggro-Phobia, a 1976 album by Suzi Quatro
 Aggrotech, a music genre
 "Pirate Aggro", a 1987 song by The Housemartins
 "A Taste of Aggro", a 1978 song by The Barron Knights

Other uses
 Aggro, one of the Magic: The Gathering deck types and applicable to other collectible card games
 Aggro Crag (later Super Aggro Crag), a mountain from the TV show Nickelodeon GUTS
 The Aggro Dome, a building in Mega-City One, a fictional city in the Judge Dredd comic books
 Aggro, hate or threat, a mechanism used in video game AI to determine the target prioritization of computer-controlled characters
 Aggro, a system used in Army of Two and Army of Two: The 40th Day
 Aggro-Kick, a move used in Tony Hawk's Proving Ground to gain speed during regular forward skating

See also
 Agro (disambiguation)